Lithocarpus lampadarius is a tree in the beech family Fagaceae. The specific epithet lampadarius is from the Greek lampas meaning "torch", referring to the use of its twigs as torches for fishing in Peninsular Malaysia.

Description
The brown bark is scaly or fissured.

Distribution and habitat
Lithocarpus lampadarius grows naturally in Peninsular Malaysia and Borneo.

References

lampadarius
Flora of Malaya
Flora of Borneo
Plants described in 1914